A Clambake is a New England dish.

Clambake may also refer to:
Clambake (film), 1967 film starring Elvis Presley
Clambake (album), 1967 album by Elvis Presley
Operation Clambake, xenu.net, Norway-based non-profit organization, launched in 1996

See also
Crosby Clambake, AT&T Pebble Beach Pro-Am
Clambake Club of Newport, private club in Middletown, Rhode Island
The Clambakes Series live albums by Superchunk  2002-2004